Attila Szujó (born 14 September 2003) is a Hungarian football defender who plays for Győr.

Club career
On 7 July 2022, Szujó signed a three-year contract with Győr.

Career statistics

References

External links
 
 

2003 births
People from Kecskemét
Sportspeople from Bács-Kiskun County
Living people
Hungarian footballers
Association football defenders
Hungary youth international footballers
Debreceni VSC players
Győri ETO FC players
Nemzeti Bajnokság I players
Nemzeti Bajnokság II players